Oliver Hundebøll Jørgensen (born 19 April 1999) is a Danish professional golfer. In 2022, he won the Mangaung Open, a co-sanctioned Challenge Tour and Sunshine Tour event.

Career
Hundebøll is from Silkeborg, and has since he was 8 years old been playing for Silkeborg Ry Golf Club, a club that also fostered Thomas Bjørn.

As an amateur, Hundebøll won the DGU Elite Tour I in 2016 and 2018. Representing the Danish National Team he won the European Boys' Team Championship in 2017.

Hundebøll turned professional in early 2019 and joined the 2019 Nordic Golf League (NGL), where he recorded one victory his rookie year. He also made seven starts on the 2019 Challenge Tour where hist best finish was a solo 3rd at the Lalla Aïcha Challenge Tour held at Royal Golf Dar Es Salam in Morocco. In 2021 he made 16 starts and 12 cuts on the Challenge Tour, with best result a tie for 5th at the Dormy Open held at Österåker Golf Club in Sweden.

Hundebøll won his first Challenge Tour title at the 2022 Mangaung Open at Bloemfontein Golf Club in South Africa. He came from five strokes behind on the final day to secure victory in difficult conditions after a birdie on the final hole.

Amateur wins
2016 DGU Elite Tour I 
2018 DGU Elite Tour I

Source:

Professional wins (2)

Sunshine Tour wins (1)

1Co-sanctioned by the Challenge Tour

Challenge Tour wins (1)

1Co-sanctioned by the Sunshine Tour

Challenge Tour playoff record (0–1)

Nordic Golf League wins (1)

Team appearances
Amateur
European Boys' Team Championship (representing Denmark): 2017 (winners)

See also
2022 Challenge Tour graduates

References

External links

Danish male golfers
Sportspeople from the Central Denmark Region
People from Silkeborg
1999 births
Living people